Shahrak-e Alzahra (also Romanized as Shahrak-e Alzahrā and Shahrak az Zahrā) is a village in Cham Chamal Rural District, Bisotun District, Harsin County, Kermanshah Province, Iran. At the 2006 census, its population was 1,549, in 345 families.

References 

Populated places in Harsin County